The Battle of Augusta, also known as the Battle of Agosta and the Battle of Etna, took place on 22 April 1676 during the Franco-Dutch War and was fought between a French fleet of 29 men-of-war, five frigates and eight fireships under Abraham Duquesne, and a Dutch-Spanish fleet of at least 28 warships (17 Dutch, 11 Spanish) besides several frigates and five fireships with a Spanish admiral in overall command and Dutch Lieutenant-Admiral-General Michiel de Ruyter commanding the squadron most involved in the fighting. 

The battle was intense although only a part of each fleet was engaged for much of its duration. It ended when de Ruyter skillfully extracted his outnumbered squadron from being attacked on both sides by superior French numbers, without the loss of any ships, however, he was mortally wounded in the process. The next morning the fleets separated without resuming fighting. Neither side lost a ship, so the result was tactically inconclusive. However, the Dutch casualties were greater than those of the French and, as Dutch-Spanish fleet had hoped to defeat the French fleet and attack Messina, it was a strategic defeat for them.

Background 
Louis XIV continued his father and grandfather's policy of rivalry with the Habsburgs and sought to expand France eastwards into Habsburg territory, while the Dutch wished to avoid war with either France or England, and preferred Spanish control of the southern Netherlands to having a common frontier with France. The Treaty of the Pyrenees that ended the Franco-Spanish War in 1659 provided for Louis XIV to marry Maria Theresa, the eldest daughter of Philip IV of Spain, who  renounced her right to inherit the Spanish throne to prevent its acquisition by a future French king. The treaty also provided for the payment of a substantial dowry to Louis, which was never paid. 

On the death Philip IV in September 1665, his infant son Charles II of Spain was proclaimed king. He was the child of Philip's second wife Mariana of Austria who became her son's regent. Mariana's nearest male relative, the Emperor Leopold would have a claim to inherit the Spanish Empire through his mother, Maria Anna of Spain, if Charles died childless, so Louis therefore claimed that, since Maria Theresa's dowry had not been paid, her renunciation was invalid. In addition, he referred to an obscure law of the duchies of Brabant and Limburg that prioritised the children of a first marriage in cases of inheritance and finally argued that Maria Theresa's rights to the Spanish throne "devolved" to him. The French invasion of the Spanish Netherlands in 1667 was initially very successful, but on 31 July,  Peace of Breda ended the Second Anglo-Dutch War and the Dutch began discussions with England and Sweden on creating a diplomatic alliance to protect Spain against France. Although in the subsequent the Treaty of Aix-la-Chapelle, signed by Spain and France on 2 May 1668 allowed Louis XIV to retain several towns in the Spanish Netherlands, he had to return three other cities there and the province of Franche-Comté to Spain. Louis consequently resented this Dutch intervention and used skillful diplomacy and money to detach England and Sweden from their alliance with the Dutch by April 1672.

France then invaded the United Netherlands in May 1672 initiating the Franco-Dutch War. After initial successes and the Dutch offer of very favourable peace terms, which Louis refused, the Dutch retreated behind the inundations they had caused by opening river sluices and prepared to resist the French by land and sea. In 1674, the city of Messina in Sicily had revolted against rule by Spain and expelled its Spanish garrison. The city asked for French protection and a small French squadron with a few troops and some food supplies was sent, but it had to withdraw before the year end in the face of a Spanish fleet of 22 ships and numerous galleys. A stronger French force of 20 ships, including nine ships of the line, and a supply convoy managed to break through the Spanish blockade and defeat the more numerous Spanish fleet in a battle off the  Lipari Islands on 11 February 1675, capturing one Spanish warship, and it ended the Spanish blockade of Messina and brought considerable food supplies to the city. This battle is sometimes referred to as the First Battle of Stromboli. 

The Spanish then asked for Dutch assistance. Michiel de Ruyter was sent to the Mediterranean with eighteen larger warships and a number of smaller vessels although, because Dutch resources had been strained by the continuing Franco-Dutch War, these ships were not fully manned. After waiting for two months on the Spanish coast for the supplies promised by the Spanish authorities and for a Spanish squadron to join him, de Ruyter sailed for Sicily at the year end and, on 8 January 1676, fought a French fleet of roughly equal numbers but greater firepower in the inconclusive Battle of Stromboli, following which the Dutch lost one ship that sunk after severe battle damage. Later in 1676, de Ruyter was joined by a Spanish squadron of at least ten warships, and the combined fleet, now commanded by the Spanish admiral Don Francisco de la Cerda, wishing to attack Messina, which required defeating the French fleet, decided to attack Augusta to force the French fleet to leave Messina harbour.

Battle 
The attack on Augusta had the desired effect of drawing the French fleet out to sea and, on 22 April 1676, the two fleets met in the Bay of Catania north of Augusta. De la Cerda rejected de Ruyter's suggestion of mingling Dutch and Spanish ships, and the Spanish formed the combined fleet's centre squadron, with Dutch squadrons in the van, led by de Ruyter, and rear, under Jan de Haan. Both available sources agree that there were 29 French ships of the line and 13 Dutch warships, not all fit to fight in line. Jenkins mentions ten Spanish warships, Blackmore 14, besides several Dutch and Spanish frigates, and also five French frigates and eight fireships, and he also suggests that the French fleet was superior in firepower to its opponents.  
 
Both fleets sailed in line ahead and were organised into three divisions. The battle was largely an intense fight between the two van squadrons, as de la Cerda kept the centre at long range from its French counterpart, possibly because his ships were short of gunpowder. Some ships in the rear of de Haan's squadron had engaged the tail of Gabret's squadron, but otherwise this squadron kept in line with the Spanish centre for most of the battle. The conduct of the Spanish centre enabled the leading ships of Duquesne's centre to join in the attack on de Ruyter's van squadron and engage his outnumbered ships on both sides. 

In the fierce fighting between the two van divisions, the French ship Lys was forced out of line and the commander of the French van, Lieutenant-Général Alméras was killed. Towards the end of the day, de Ruyter in Eendracht attacked Duquesne in Saint-Esprit with the intention of boarding. but Tourville in Sceptre, aided by Saint Michel went to their admiral's aid. The Dutch van suffered more severely than its opponents, with three of its ships so badly damaged that they had to be towed to port by Spanish galleys. De Ruyter was able to extract his squadron by his own seamanship and the assistance of de Haan who moved to his support. Some belated assistance near the end of the battle from de la Cerda also helped the Dutch van to disengage from fighting. During the course of the Dutch van's disengagement from fighting, de Ruyter was fatally wounded when a cannonball struck him in the leg, and he died a week later at Syracuse.

The next morning, the fleets separated without further fighting and combined Dutch-Spanish fleet withdrew to Palermo to repair their battle damage, abandoning any attempt to attack Messina. A month later, on 28 May 1676, the French fleet attacked combined Dutch-Spanish fleet and a squadron of Spanish galleys, all at anchor in Palermo harbour in the naval Battle of Palermo and destroyed two Dutch warships by gunfire seven Spanish warships and two galleys and another Dutch ship by the use of fireships in the enclosed harbour. De Haan, who had assumed command of the Dutch fleet after de Ruyter's death, was killed by a cannonball during the battle. Despite this significant victory, the French withdrew from Messina in 1678 and the Spanish viceroy of Sicily regained control of the city.

Order of battle

France (Abraham Duquesne)

Twenty-nine ships of the line
Five frigates
Eight fireships

Van Squadron (Alméras)
Fidèle 56 (Chevalier de Cogolin)
Heureux 54 (Monsieur de La Bretesche)
Vermandois 50 (Chevalier de Tambonneau, killed)
Pompeux 72 (Chevalier de Valbelle, chef d'escadre)
Lys 74 (Lieutenant-Général Marquis Guillaume d'Alméras, killed; flag-captains Etienne Gentet and Chevalier de Montbron)
Magnifique 72 (Monsieur de La Gravière)
Parfait 60 (Monsieur de Chasteneuf)
Apollon 54 (Chevalier de Forbin)
Trident 38 (Chevalier de Bellefontaine)

Fireships
Ardent
Orage

Centre Squadron (Duquesne)
Fortune 56 (Marquis d'Amfreville)
Aimable 56 (Monsieur de La Barre)
Joli 46 (Monsieur de Belle-Isle)
Éclatant 60 (Monsieur de Coü, killed; replaced by Monsieur de Saint-Germen)
Sceptre 80 (Comte Anne Hilarion de Tourville)
Saint-Esprit 72 (vice-admiral Abraham Duquesne)
Saint Michel 60 (Marquis de Preuilly d'Humiéres)
Mignon 46 (Monsieur de Relingues)
Aquilon 50 (Monsieur de Montreuil)
Vaillant 54 (Monsieur de Septesme)

Fireships
Salvador
Imprudent
Inquiet

Rear Squadron (Gabaret)
Assuré 56 (Marquis de Villette-Mursay)
Brusque 46 (Chevalier De La Mothe)
Syrène 46 (Chevalier de Béthune)
Fier 60 (Monsieur de Chabert)
Agréable 56 (Monsieur d'Ailly)
Sans-Pareil 70 (chef d'escadre Jean Gabaret, flag-captain Alain Emmanuel de Coëtlogon)
Grand 72 (Monsieur de Beaulieu)
Sage 54 (Marquis de Langeron)
Prudent 54 (Monsieur de La Fayette)
Téméraire 50 (Chevalier de Levy)

Fireships:
Dangereux
Hameson
Dame-de-la-Mère

Netherlands/Spain (Michiel de Ruyter/Francisco De la Cerda)

Twenty-seven ships of the line
Several minor warships and galleys

De Ruyter Dutch squadron (van) 
Spiegel 70 (Gilles Schey)
Groenwijf 36 (Jan Noirot)
Leiden 36 (Jan van Abkoude)
Leeuwen 50 (Frans Willem, Graaf van Limburg Stirum)
Eendracht 76 (Lt-Admiral Michiel De Ruyter, died; flag-captain Gerard Callenburgh)
Stad en Lande 54 (Joris Andringa)
Zuiderhuis 46 (Pieter de Sitter)
Damiaten 34 (Isaac van Uitterwijk)
Oosterwijk 60 (Jacob Teding van Berkhout)
Tonijn 8 (snauw, Philips Melkenbeek)
Kreeft 8 (snauw, Wijbrand Barendszoon)
Ter Goes 8 (snauw, Abraham Wilmerdonk)
Salm 4 (fireship, Jan van Kampen)
Melkmeisje 2 (fireship, Arent Ruyghaver)
Zwarte Tas 4 (Jacob Stadtlander)

De la Cerda Spanish squadron (centre) 
10 or 12 ships among them:
 Nuestra Señora del Pilar (Capitana Real) 64/74 (1000-1100 crew) Almirante Francisco Pereire Freire de La Cerda (or de La Zerda)
 Santiago (Nueva Real) 80
 San Antonio de Napoles 44/46 (500 crew)
 San Felipe 40/44
 San Carlo/Salvator delle Fiandre/San Salvador (Almiranta de Flandres) 40/42/48 (350 crew)
 San Joaquin/San Juan 80
 San Gabriel 40
 Santa Ana 54/60
 Nuestra Señora del Rosario 50
 Nuestra Señora de Guadalupe
 Nuestra Señora del Rosario y Las Animas

De Haan Dutch squadron (rear) 
Steenbergen 68 (Pieter van Middelandt)
Wakende Boei 46 (Cornelis Tijloos)
Edam 34 (Cornelis van der Zaan)
Kraanvogel 46 (Jacob Willemszoon Broeder)
Gouda 76 (Vice-Admiral Jan de Haan)
Provincie van Utrecht 60 (Jan de Jong)
Vrijheid 50 (Adam van Brederode)
Harderwijk 46 (Mattheus Megang)
Prinsen Wapen 8 (snauw, Hendrik Walop)
Rouaan 8 (snauw, Willem Knijf)
Roos 8 (snauw, Juriaan Baak)
Sint Salvador 6 (fireship, Jan Janszoon Bont)
Jakob en Anna 4 (fireship, Dirk Klaaszoon Harney)
Witte tas 4 (supply ship, Adriaan van Esch)

Commemoration 

References

Sources
 

 
 
 
 
 

Augusta
Agosta
1676 in France